Bernard S. Neistein (August 15, 1916 – October 3, 2003) was an American lawyer and politician.

Neistein was born in Chicago, Illinois. He went to the Chicago public schools. He went to Crane College, DePaul Commerce School, and DePaul University College of Law. Neistein was admitted to the Illinois bar and practiced law in Chicago. He served in the United States Army during World War II and was commissioned a lieutenant. Neistein served in the Illinois House of Representatives from 1957 to 1959 and in the Illinois Senate from 1959 to 1973. He was a Democrat. Neistein died at Northwestern memorial Hospital in Chicago, Illinois.

Notes

1916 births
2003 deaths
Lawyers from Chicago
Politicians from Chicago
Military personnel from Illinois
Malcolm X College alumni
DePaul University alumni
Democratic Party members of the Illinois House of Representatives
Democratic Party Illinois state senators
20th-century American politicians
20th-century American lawyers